Liu Cheng (born 4 January 1992) is a retired badminton player who represented China. He was the men's doubles World Champion in 2017 partnered with Zhang Nan, also the mixed doubles World and Asian Junior Champion in 2010 with Bao Yixin. Liu was part of the national team member that won the team events at the 2015, 2021 Sudirman Cup, 2018 Thomas Cup and 2018 Asian Games. He reached a career high of world number 2 in both men's and mixed doubles events. He announced his retirement from the international tournament on 30 June 2022.

Achievements

BWF World Championships 
Men's doubles

Mixed doubles

Asian Championships 
Men's doubles

Summer Universiade 
Mixed doubles

BWF World Junior Championships 
Mixed doubles

Asian Junior Championships 
Mixed doubles

BWF World Tour (2 runners-up) 
The BWF World Tour, which was announced on 19 March 2017 and implemented in 2018, is a series of elite badminton tournaments sanctioned by the Badminton World Federation (BWF). The BWF World Tour is divided into levels of World Tour Finals, Super 1000, Super 750, Super 500, Super 300 (part of the HSBC World Tour), and the BWF Tour Super 100.

Men's doubles

BWF Superseries (2 titles, 7 runners-up) 
The BWF Superseries, which was launched on 14 December 2006 and implemented in 2007, was a series of elite badminton tournaments, sanctioned by the Badminton World Federation (BWF). BWF Superseries levels were Superseries and Superseries Premier. A season of Superseries consisted of twelve tournaments around the world that had been introduced since 2011. Successful players were invited to the Superseries Finals, which were held at the end of each year.

Men's doubles

Mixed doubles

  BWF Superseries Finals tournament
  BWF Superseries Premier tournament
  BWF Superseries tournament

BWF Grand Prix (2 titles, 2 runners-up) 
The BWF Grand Prix had two levels, the Grand Prix and Grand Prix Gold. It was a series of badminton tournaments sanctioned by the Badminton World Federation (BWF) and played between 2007 and 2017.

Men's doubles

Mixed doubles

  BWF Grand Prix Gold tournament
  BWF Grand Prix tournament

References

External links 
 

1992 births
Living people
People from Sanming
Badminton players from Fujian
Chinese male badminton players
Badminton players at the 2018 Asian Games
Asian Games gold medalists for China
Asian Games medalists in badminton
Medalists at the 2018 Asian Games
Universiade silver medalists for China
Universiade medalists in badminton
Medalists at the 2013 Summer Universiade